Steel Magnolia was an American country music duo that won season two of the television talent show Can You Duet. The duo consisted of Meghan Linsey and her fiance, Joshua Scott Jones. After becoming the top winner on the show, the duo signed a recording contract with Big Machine Records, and released its debut single "Keep On Lovin' You" in August 2009, which was a Top 10 hit on the U.S. Billboard Hot Country Songs chart.

Biography 
A native of Ponchatoula, La., 23-year-old Meghan Linsey formed Steel Magnolia with her boyfriend of three years, Joshua Scott Jones. Before trying out for Can You Duet, Linsey was a karaoke host at a Nashville karaoke bar, called Lonnie's Western Room, which is where she met Jones.

On September 29, 2011, Jones made a public announcement that he had entered drug rehabilitation. In Jones's absence, fellow country artist and former touring partner James Otto stepped in so that Steel Magnolia could continue their touring obligations while maintaining a duet. Otto cited similar musical tastes for sparking his interest in joining Linsey. After rehabilitation, Linsey and Jones decided to end their engagement yet continue on as a music duo. Linsey is currently in another relationship with musician/producer Tyler Cain.

On March 3, 2014, Linsey and Jones, together on their Facebook page, made a public announcement that they were each going to pursue solo careers.

Music career

Steel Magnolia—EP: (2009–2010) 
Steel Magnolia released their debut single "Keep On Lovin' You" shortly after winning season two of Can You Duet. It debuted at No. 58 on the Billboard country charts and became a Top 5 hit on that chart. In November 2009, the song became the highest-charting single from a Can You Duet competitor; season one finalists' Joey + Rory's debut single, "Cheater, Cheater," peaked at No. 30 on the U.S. Billboard Hot Country Songs chart in January 2009. The song served as the lead-off single to the duo's self-titled extended play, which was released on February 23, 2010. It has also been included in the soundtrack to the film Valentine's Day.

In October 2009, they made their Grand Ole Opry debut and sang "Keep on Lovin' You" as well as "I'm So Lonesome I Could Cry", by Hank Williams.

The duo earned its first Academy of Country Music Awards nomination for the 2010 Top New Vocal Duo alongside Bomshel and Joey + Rory.

Debut album: (2010–2013)
Steel Magnolia's self-titled debut album was scheduled to be released on September 21, 2010, but was pushed back and eventually released on January 11, 2011. Steel Magnolia debuted within the Top 10 of the Billboard 200 and Billboard Top Country Albums, debuting at number 7 and number 3, respectively. It sold approximately 28,000 copies in the United States during the first week of sales.

The album includes their debut single, as well as their second single, "Just By Being You (Halo and Wings)," which was released to country radio in July 2010, and became their second Top 30 single on the country charts. "Last Night Again," which was released to country radio on December 6, 2010 as the album's third single, peaked at number 24 on the country chart. A fourth single, "Bulletproof," was released on August 22, 2011.

Jones entered rehabilitation in September 2011, with James Otto filling in for him on a tour with Reba McEntire. In January 2012, Steel Magnolia parted ways with Big Machine amid rumors that the duo had parted. In June 2012, the duo announced they are working on a new album. They also performed at LP Field as part of the CMA Music Fest.

Split and solo careers: (2013–2015)
In 2013, the duo split. Jones released a solo single titled "Honk If You're Tonky", and Linsey released a cover of OneRepublic's "Counting Stars". Jones told The Boot that "I’m not saying we’ll never make another record because you never know". Linsey confirmed that the split was official.

In 2015, Linsey tried out for season 8 of The Voice, having three judges (with the exception of Blake Shelton) turn their chairs around. She chose Pharrell Williams as her coach, and was stolen by Shelton after losing in the Battle Rounds. She continued with Shelton as her coach throughout the season. She finished as the runner-up of the season.

Discography

Studio albums

Extended plays

Singles

 Notes

Music videos

Other appearances

Awards and nominations

References

External links
 
 
 

Country music groups from Tennessee
Big Machine Records artists
Country music duos
Musical groups disestablished in 2013
Musical groups established in 2009